Kevin Schulze (born 25 January 1992) is a German footballer who plays as a right-back for Lokomotive Leipzig.

Career
Schulze made his professional debut for Holstein Kiel in the 3. Liga on 1 February 2014, starting against Hallescher FC before being substituted out in the 71st minute for Patrick Breitkreuz, with the away match finishing as a 0–1 loss.

References

External links
 Profile at DFB.de
 Profile at kicker.de

1992 births
Living people
People from Wittingen
Footballers from Lower Saxony
German footballers
Germany youth international footballers
Association football fullbacks
VfL Wolfsburg II players
SpVgg Greuther Fürth players
SpVgg Greuther Fürth II players
Holstein Kiel players
FSV Wacker 90 Nordhausen players
1. FC Lokomotive Leipzig players
3. Liga players
Regionalliga players